Alegría is a Cirque du Soleil touring production, created in 1994 by director Franco Dragone and director of creation Gilles Ste-Croix. It takes its name from the Spanish word for "joy".

Since April 1994 the show has been performed over 5000 times, and has been seen by over 14 million spectators in more than 250 cities around the world.

Acts
Acts in the show included:
 aerial cube
 contortion
 fast track
 fire
 flying man
 handbalancing
 high bar
 juggling
 manipulation
 power track
 Russian bars
 shoulder pole wire
 slackwire
 strong man
 synchro trapeze
 tightwire

Costumes

Alegría's costumes have a dichotomy relating to the Old Order and the New Order. The Old Order has costumes which are reminiscent of New York's Gilded Age as they are finely decorated with feathers, lace, and other adornments. The New Order, on the other hand, representing the youth of tomorrow, have the same rich hues as the old order, while the fabrics used are lighter and softer, helping to emphasize the agility of youth.

Music

The soundtrack was composed by René Dupéré, who had composed for previous productions including Nouvelle Expérience, Saltimbanco and Mystère.

It was released as a studio album on 27 September 1994. Robbi Finkel and René Dupéré were nominated for a Grammy Award as Best Arranger at the 38th Annual Grammy Awards. The album was also nominated for several Félix Awards in 1995, winning two of the latter: 'Producer of the Year' for Robbi Finkel and René Dupéré, and 'Sound Mixer of the Year' for Rob Heaney. Alegría was also ranked on the Billboard World Music Chart for 65 weeks.

The tracks for the original 1994 release, including the two extended tracks from 2002 are listed below and alongside are the acts during which they are played.
 Alegría (Finale)
 Vai Vedrai
(Synchronized trapeze)
 (Trapeze Duplex) (2007–2010)
 Kalandéro
Shoulder-Pole Wire (1994–1995)
 Tightrope (1996, 2004)
 Juggling (2002–2004, 2006–2013)
 Slackwire (2004–2005)
 Querer (Interlude to Aerial high bar)
 Irna (Power track)
 Taruka (Contortion)
 Jeux d'enfants (Power track setup)
 Mirko (Opening)
 Icare (Aerial high bar)
 Ibis
Aerial Cube (1994–1995, 1997–1999, 2004–2008)
 Flying Man (1996, 2003–2004)
 Valsapena (Power track)
 Nocturne (Snowstorm)
 Cerceaux (Manipulation)
 Malioumba (Flying man) (2001–2013)
Other songs
 Milonga (Introduction to musicians)
 Ouverture (Pre-Opening sequence)
 Prelude to Vai Vedrai (Pre-Trapeze act sequence)
 Fleurs (Clown act) (1997–2000, 2002–2004)
 Le Feu (Fire-knife dance)
 Homme Fort (Strong man) (1994–1999, 2001–2004)
 Danze Vazoule (Le bal)
 Ombre (Clown act) (1994–2004)
 Force 4/Balafon (Russian bars)
 La Perche 1 (Shoulder-pole wire) (1994–1995)
 La Perche 2 (Shoulder-pole wire out sequence) (1994–1995)
 Prelude to Le Cube (Pre-Aerial Cube act sequence) (1994–1995, 1997–1999, 2004–2007)
 Prelude to Contortion (Pre-Contortion Cube act sequence)
 Grands Volants Prelude (Pre-High Bar act sequence)
 Sisyphe (Handbalancing) (1995–2013)
 Rinalto Vera (Cyr wheel)
 Bardak (Clown act and Juggling) (1994–1997, 2005)
 Oiseaux sur la corde (Clown act) (1994–2004)
 Concierto de Aranjuez (Clown act) (1994–1996)

Tour
Alegría tour history is quite extensive as it premiered in 1994. It has toured under the Grand Chapiteau as well as in sporting arenas. During 1999 and 2000 it played as a resident show in Biloxi's Beau Rivage.

Remount
In commemoration of the show's 25th anniversary, a new show called Alegría: In a New Light was created, in its original Big Top format to pay tribute to the original show. The tour began on 18 April 2019 in Montreal. It will feature revamped numbers, characters, costumes, music and makeup.

References

Cirque du Soleil touring shows